Mehreen Anwar Raja is a Pakistani politician who has served as member of the National Assembly of Pakistan.

Political career 
She was elected to the National Assembly of Pakistan as a candidate of Pakistan Peoples Party on a reserved seats for women from Punjab in 2002 Pakistani general election.

She was elected to the National Assembly of Pakistan as a candidate of Pakistan Peoples Party on a reserved seats for women from Punjab in 2008 Pakistani general election and was inducted into the federal cabinet of Prime Minister Yousaf Raza Gillani and was made Minister of State for Parliamentary Affairs.

References 

Pakistan People's Party MNAs
Living people
Politicians from Lahore
Pakistani MNAs 2002–2007
Women members of the National Assembly of Pakistan
Pakistani MNAs 2008–2013
Year of birth missing (living people)
21st-century Pakistani women politicians